David Triunfante Bueno (April 14, 1956 – October 22, 1987) was a Filipino human rights lawyer and radio show host from Ilocos Norte, best known his work as the most prominent human rights lawyer in Ilocos Norte during the later part of the Marcos administration and the early part of the succeeding Aquino administration. He was a member of the prestigious group called the Free Legal Assistance Group or FLAG, the oldest and largest group of human rights lawyers in the country.
 
He was assassinated by two men on a motorcycle wearing fatigue uniforms on October 22, 1987 – part of a wave of assassinations that included the murder of activist Lean Alejandro and labor leader Rolando Olalia. This coincided with the 1986-87 coup d'etat that tried to remove Corazon Aquino from power following the 1986 People Power Revolution.

He was honored in 2010 by having his name inscribed on the wall of remembrance at the Philippines’ Bantayog ng mga Bayani, which honors the heroes and martyrs who fought against Ferdinand Marcos and his martial law regime.

See also 
 Bantayog ng mga Bayani
 Rolando Olalia
 Lean Alejandro

References 

 Individuals honored at the Bantayog ng mga Bayani
 Northern Luzon during martial law under Ferdinand Marcos
Lawyers honored at the Bantayog ng mga Bayani
Journalists honored at the Bantayog ng mga Bayani